Jerdon's tree frog can refer to two distinct species of frogs:
 Hyla annectans in the family Hylidae
 Nasutixalus jerdonii in the family Rhacophoridae

Animal common name disambiguation pages